Lake Cochrane is a lake in South Dakota, in the United States.

Lake Cochrane has the name of Byron J. Cochrane, a pioneer who settled at the lake in the 1870s.

See also
List of lakes in South Dakota

References

Lakes of South Dakota
Lakes of Deuel County, South Dakota